is a professional Japanese baseball player. He plays pitcher for the Yokohama DeNA BayStars.

External links

 NPB.com

1989 births
Living people
People from Shinshiro, Aichi
Baseball people from Aichi Prefecture
Japanese baseball players
Nippon Professional Baseball pitchers
Yokohama BayStars players
Yokohama DeNA BayStars players